Cecep Syamsul Hari (born May 1, 1967, in Bandung, West Java) is an Indonesian poet. He is the editor of Horison Monthly literary magazine. Besides poems, he has published selected essays, critics, short-stories, a fictocriticism novel, and some translation-works. His works had been translated into English, German, Korea, Bengali, Portugal, and Czech.

References

External links 
 

Indonesian male poets
Living people
1967 births